Isaac Daniel Young (March 29, 1849 – December 10, 1927) was a U.S. Representative from Kansas.

Born near Pleasantville, Iowa, Young attended high school and Oskaloosa College in Iowa and began teaching at the age of fifteen, continuing in that profession for ten years. He moved to Mitchell County, Kansas, in 1874 and settled on a homestead in Turkey Creek Township. He engaged in agricultural pursuits for eleven years. Superintendent of public instruction of Mitchell County, Kansas from 1876 to 1880. He served as member of the State senate 1884-1888. He moved to Beloit, Kansas, in 1885. He studied law. He was admitted to the bar in 1889 and commenced practice in Beloit, Kansas. He was again a member of the State senate 1904-1908.

Young was elected as a Republican to the Sixty-second Congress (March 4, 1911 – March 3, 1913). He was an unsuccessful for reelection in 1912. He resumed the practice of law in Beloit, Kansas, until his death on December 10, 1927. He was interred in Elmwood Cemetery.

References

1849 births
1927 deaths
Republican Party Kansas state senators
Oskaloosa College alumni
People from Beloit, Kansas
People from Mitchell County, Kansas
Republican Party members of the United States House of Representatives from Kansas
19th-century American politicians
20th-century American politicians